Dichrorampha obscuratana is a moth belonging to the family Tortricidae first described by Wolff in 1955.

It is native to Europe.

References

Grapholitini